Canberra Central is one of the original eighteen districts of the Australian Capital Territory used in land administration consisting of both the districts of North Canberra and South Canberra. The district is subdivided into divisions (suburbs), sections and blocks. The district of Canberra Central lies entirely within the bounds of the city of Canberra, the capital city of Australia.

Establishment and governance
The traditional custodians of the district are the indigenous people of the Ngunawal tribe.

Following the transfer of land from the Government of New South Wales to the Commonwealth Government in 1911, the district was established in 1966 by the Commonwealth via the gazettal of the Districts Ordinance 1966 (Cth) which, after the enactment of the Australian Capital Territory (Self-Government) Act 1988, became the Districts Act 1966. This Act was subsequently repealed by the ACT Government and the district is now administered subject to the Districts Act 2002.

Location and urban structure
The district of Central Canberra is a set of contiguous residential suburbs consolidated around Lake Burley Griffin, together with a town centre located at Canberra City (also known as Civic), and a range of commercial suburbs, some of which form parts of the Parliamentary Triangle and contain many of Canberra's national monuments and institutions. The district is often known as two separate parts, being the Inner North and Inner South. While some of the other districts in the Australian Capital Territory and within the city of Canberra are well known (e.g. Belconnen, Gungahlin, Tuggeranong, Weston Creek, Woden Valley) Canberra Central would less often be thought of as a district outside of its administrative use: more often as the Inner North and Inner South. The district of Canberra Central is mentioned in various ACT legislation.

Canberra Central is bounded on the north by the Gungahlin district, the east by the Majura district, the south-east by the Jerrabombera district (as distinct from the suburb of  that lies within the Queanbeyan local government area within New South Wales), the south by the district of the Woden Valley, the south-west by the Weston Creek district, and the west and north-west by the Belconnen district.

Inner north

The district includes the inner north divisions (suburbs) of Acton, Ainslie, Braddon, Campbell, City, Dickson, Downer, Hackett, Lyneham, O'Connor, Reid, Russell, Turner and Watson (except for the very north end near the Australian Heritage Village which is in the Majura district). Part of the nature park to the east and south of Mount Majura is also in the district. It also includes Black Mountain and the land south of Lady Denman Drive around Yarramundi Reach, near Lake Burley Griffin.

Inner south

The district includes the inner south divisions (suburbs) of Barton, Capital Hill, Deakin, Forrest, Fyshwick, Griffith, Kingston, Narrabundah, Parkes, Red Hill (except for the Federal Golf Course which is in Woden Valley district), and Yarralumla.

Demographics
Population growth in Canberra Central was slower than the national average during the first five years (the national average was 5.8%), but it has been significantly faster since (the national average was 8.3, 8.8% and 8.6% respectively in the last three periods). The median weekly income for residents within the Canberra Central district was significantly higher than the national average.

References

External links

 ACTMAPi

1966 establishments in Australia
Districts of the Australian Capital Territory